This is a list of National Basketball Association players whose last names begin with N or O.

The list also includes players from the American National Basketball League (NBL), the Basketball Association of America (BAA), and the original American Basketball Association (ABA). All of these leagues contributed to the formation of the present-day NBA.

Individuals who played in the NBL prior to its 1949 merger with the BAA are listed in italics, as they are not traditionally listed in the NBA's official player registers.

N

Hamady N'Diaye
Makhtar N'Diaye
Mamadou N'Diaye
Boniface N'Dong
Bob Naber
Boštjan Nachbar
Abdel Nader
Jerry Nagel
Jake Nagode
Fritz Nagy
Lee Nailon
Eduardo Nájera
Larry Nance
Larry Nance Jr.
Shabazz Napier
Paul Napolitano
Bob Nash
Cotton Nash
Steve Nash
Swen Nater
Howard Nathan
Calvin Natt
Kenny Natt
Willie Naulls
Juan Carlos Navarro
Maurice Ndour
Craig Neal
Gary Neal
Jim Neal
Lloyd Neal
Ed Nealy
Lyle Neat
Nemanja Nedović
Al Negratti
George Nelmark
Barry Nelson
DeMarcus Nelson
Don Nelson
Jameer Nelson
Louie Nelson
Ron Nelson
Andrew Nembhard
RJ Nembhard
Ruben Nembhard
Dick Nemelka
Nenê
Tyrone Nesby
Aaron Nesmith
Martin Nessley
Rasho Nesterović
Raulzinho Neto
Bob Netolicky
Bobby Neu
Johnny Neumann
Paul Neumann
Chuck Nevitt
Melvin Newbern
Ivano Newbill
Ira Newble
Mike Newlin
Johnny Newman
Malik Newman
Dave Newmark
Bill Newton
Georges Niang
Demetris Nichols
Jack Nichols
Oren Nichols
Andrew Nicholson
Gaylon Nickerson
Carl Nicks
Rich Niemann
Richie Niemiera
Mike Niles
Kurt Nimphius
Fred Nimz
Tommy Nisbet
Daishen Nix
Dyron Nix
Norm Nixon
Zeke Nnaji
Joakim Noah
Chuck Noble
Andrés Nocioni
David Noel
Nerlens Noel
Paul Noel
Lucas Nogueira
Jim Nolan
Paul Nolen
Jeff Nordgaard
Bevo Nordmann
Irv Noren
Johnny Norlander
Coniel Norman
Ken Norman
Audie Norris
Moochie Norris
Sylvester Norris
Woody Norris
Zach Norvell Jr.
Willie Norwood
George Nostrand
Stan Noszka 
Mike Novak
Steve Novak
John Novotny
Paul Nowak
Jaylen Nowell
Mel Nowell
Dirk Nowitzki
Frank Ntilikina
Bob Nugent
Kendrick Nunn
James Nunnally
Jusuf Nurkić
Dennis Nutt
David Nwaba
Jordan Nwora
Julius Nwosu

O

Charles O'Bannon
Ed O'Bannon
John O'Boyle
Bob O'Brien
Jim O'Brien (b. 1950)
Jim O'Brien (b. 1951)
J. J. O'Brien
John O'Brien
Ralph O'Brien
Tommy O'Brien
Johnny O'Bryant III
Patrick O'Bryant
Dermie O'Connell
Connie O'Connor
Andy O'Donnell
Jim O'Donnell
Neil O'Donnell
Buddy O'Grady
Fran O'Hanlon
Dick O'Keefe
Tommy O'Keefe
Hank O'Keeffe
Mike O'Koren
Grady O'Malley
Jermaine O'Neal
Shaquille O'Neal
Royce O'Neale
Mike O'Neill
Kyle O'Quinn
Bud O'Rourke
Bob O'Shaughnessy
Kevin O'Shea
Garland O'Shields
Dan O'Sullivan
Tom O'Toole
Charles Oakley
Red Oberbruner
Jack Oberst
Fabricio Oberto
Daniel Ochefu
Russ Ochsenhirt
Greg Oden
Lamar Odom
Bud Ogden
Ralph Ogden
Alan Ogg
Don Ohl
Tim Ohlbrecht
Semi Ojeleye
Emeka Okafor
Jahlil Okafor
Chuma Okeke
Élie Okobo
Josh Okogie
Onyeka Okongwu
Isaac Okoro
KZ Okpala
Mehmet Okur
Victor Oladipo
Hakeem Olajuwon
Mark Olberding
Jawann Oldham
John Oldham
Frank Oleynick
John Olive
Brian Oliver
Cameron Oliver
Dean Oliver
Jimmy Oliver
Vince Oliver
Kevin Ollie
Gene Ollrich
Michael Olowokandi
Bud Olsen
Jim Olsen
Oscar Olson
Kelly Olynyk
Eugene Omoruyi
Miye Oni
Arinze Onuaku
Chinanu Onuaku
Bernard Opper
Eddie Oram
Barry Orms
Johnny Orr (b. 1918)
Johnny Orr (b. 1927)
Louis Orr
José Ortiz
Daniel Orton
Chuck Osborne
Leo Osiewalski
Cedi Osman
Wally Osterkorn
Greg Ostertag
Matt Othick
Don Otten
Mac Otten
Daniel Oturu
Frank Otway
Kelly Oubre Jr.
Bo Outlaw
Travis Outlaw
Claude Overton
Doug Overton
Andre Owens
Billy Owens
Chris Owens
Eddie Owens
Jim Owens
Keith Owens
Larry Owens
Red Owens
Tariq Owens
Tom Owens
Ray Owes
Olumide Oyedeji
Jack Ozburn

References
  NBA & ABA Players with Last Names Starting with N and O @ basketball-reference.com
 NBL Players with Last Names Starting with N and O @ basketball-reference.com

N